The DOS API is an API which originated with 86-DOS and is used in MS-DOS/PC DOS and other DOS-compatible operating systems.  Most calls to the DOS API are invoked using software interrupt 21h (INT 21h). By calling INT 21h with a subfunction number in the AH processor register and other parameters in other registers, various DOS services can be invoked. These include handling keyboard input, video output, disk file access, program execution, memory allocation, and various other activities. In the late 1980s, DOS extenders along with the DOS Protected Mode Interface (DPMI) allow the programs to run in either 16-bit or 32-bit protected mode and still have access to the DOS API.

History of the DOS API
The original DOS API in 86-DOS and MS-DOS 1.0 was designed to be functionally compatible with CP/M. Files were accessed using file control blocks (FCBs). The DOS API was greatly extended in MS-DOS 2.0 with several Unix concepts, including file access using file handles, hierarchical directories and device I/O control. In DOS 3.1, network redirector support was added. In MS-DOS 3.31, the INT 25h/26h functions were enhanced to support hard disks greater than 32 MB. MS-DOS 5 added support for using upper memory blocks (UMBs). After MS-DOS 5, the DOS API was unchanged for the successive standalone releases of DOS.

The DOS API and Windows
In Windows 9x, DOS loaded the protected-mode system and graphical shell. DOS was usually accessed from a virtual DOS machine (VDM) but it was also possible to boot directly to real mode MS-DOS 7.0 without loading Windows. The DOS API was extended with enhanced internationalization support and long filename support, though the long filename support was only available in a VDM. With Windows 95 OSR2, DOS was updated to 7.1, which added FAT32 support, and functions were added to the DOS API to support this. Windows 98 and Windows ME also implement the MS-DOS 7.1 API, though Windows ME reports itself as MS-DOS 8.0.

Windows NT and the systems based on it (e.g. Windows XP and Windows Vista) are not based on MS-DOS, but use a virtual machine, NTVDM, to handle the DOS API. NTVDM works by running a DOS program in virtual 8086 mode (an emulation of real mode within protected mode available on 80386 and higher processors). NTVDM supports the DOS 5.0 API. DOSEMU for Linux uses a similar approach.

Interrupt vectors used by DOS
The following is the list of interrupt vectors used by programs to invoke the DOS API functions.

DOS INT 21h services
The following is the list of functions provided via the DOS API primary software interrupt vector.

Operating systems with native support
 MS-DOS – most widespread implementation
 PC DOS – IBM OEM version of MS-DOS
 OS/2 1.x – Microsoft/IBM successor to MS-DOS and PC DOS
 SISNE plus – Clone created by Itautec and Scopus Tecnologia in Brazil 
 DR-DOS – Digital Research DOS family, including Novell DOS, PalmDOS, OpenDOS, etc.
 PTS-DOS – PhysTechSoft & Paragon DOS clone, including S/DOS
 ROM-DOS – Datalight ROM DOS version
 Embedded DOS – General Software version
 FreeDOS – Free, open source DOS clone
 ReactOS (IA-32 and x86-64 versions)
 Windows 95 – contains MS-DOS 7.0
 Windows 98 – contains MS-DOS 7.1
 Windows 98 SE – contains MS-DOS 7.1
 Windows ME – contains MS-DOS 8.0

Operating systems with DOS emulation layer
 Concurrent CP/M-86 (3.1 only) with PCMODE – Digital Research CP/M-86-based OS with optional PC DOS emulator
 Concurrent DOS – Digital Research CDOS family with built-in PC DOS emulator
 DOS Plus – a stripped-down single-user variant of Concurrent PC DOS 4.1–5.0
 Multiuser DOS – Digital Research/Novell MDOS family including Datapac System Manager, IMS REAL/32, etc.
 OS/2 (2.x and later) – IBM operating system using a fully-licensed MS-DOS 5.0 in a virtual machine
 Windows NT (all versions except 64-bit editions)

Other emulators
 NTVDM for Windows NT
 DOSEMU for Linux
 DOSBox
 ReactOS

See also
 BIOS interrupt call
 Ralf Brown's Interrupt List (RBIL)
 Comparison of DOS operating systems
 DOS Protected Mode Interface (DPMI)
 DOS extender
 DOS MZ executable
 COMMAND.COM

References

Further reading
  (xvii+1053 pages; 29 cm) (NB. This original edition contains flowcharts of the internal workings of the system. It was withdrawn by Microsoft before mass-distribution in 1986 because it contained many factual errors as well as some classified information which should not have been published. Few printed copies survived. It was replaced by a completely reworked edition in 1988. )
  (xix+1570 pages; 26 cm) (NB. This edition was published in 1988 after extensive rework of the withdrawn 1986 first edition by a different team of authors. )
 The New Peter Norton Programmer's Guide to the IBM PC & PS/2 by Peter Norton and Richard Wilton, Microsoft Press, 1987 .
 
 The Programmer's PC Sourcebook by Thom Hogan, Microsoft Press, 1991 
 Microsoft MS-DOS Programmer's Reference - The Official Technical Reference to MS-DOS, Microsoft Press, 1993 
 IBM PC DOS 7 Technical Update
  (Printed in the UK.)

External links
 The x86 Interrupt List (a.k.a. RBIL, Ralf Brown's Interrupt List)
 ctyme.com - INT Calls by function
 wustl.edu - Description of MS-DOS services

DOS technology
Operating system APIs
X86 architecture
Interrupts